Nebraska Highway 44 (NE-44) is a  highway in Franklin, Kearney, and Buffalo counties in Nebraska, United States. It runs in a south-to-north direction from Nebraska Highway 4 (NE-4) south of Wilcox to an intersection with Interstate 80 (I-80) in Kearney.

Route description
NE-44 begins at an intersection with NE-4 south of Wilcox. It heads through farmland and passes through Wilcox, then meets U.S. Route 6/U.S. Route 6 (US 6/US 34), which are concurrent with each other. NE-44 then turns east with US 6/US 34 and passes through Axtell.  East of Axtell, NE-44 turns north. Near Kearney, NE-44 meets Nebraska Link 50A, which serves as a link to Fort Kearny State Historical Park. Shortly after, NE-44 crosses the Platte River and becomes a divided highway. NE-44 then enters Kearney and meets Interstate 80, where it ends on the north side of the westbound I-80 ramps. The roadway continues north towards downtown Kearney as Second Avenue.

Major intersections

See also

 List of state highways in Nebraska

References

External links

 Nebraska Roads: NE 41-60

044
Transportation in Franklin County, Nebraska
Transportation in Kearney County, Nebraska
Transportation in Buffalo County, Nebraska